Jordan Claire Robbins (born January 24, 1990) is a Bermudian-Canadian actress and model. Robbins is best known for her role as Grace in The Umbrella Academy television series.

Robbins was born and raised in Bermuda. After graduating high school in 2008, she moved to Toronto to double major in drama and psychology at the University of Toronto. 

She began modeling and soon fell into acting while in Canada. She made her acting debut guest starring in the television series Man Seeking Woman, and thereafter had a recurring role in the series 12 Monkeys (both 2015). She continued appearing in various television series, including Supernatural. She had her breakthrough portraying Grace Hargreeves, a robot, in the Netflix series The Umbrella Academy (2019–present), which has brought her widespread recognition. Robbins has also appeared on The Wayne Ayers Podcast.

Filmography

Film

Television

References

External links 
 

1990 births
21st-century Canadian actresses
Actresses from Toronto
Bermudian actresses
Bermudian female models
Female models from Ontario
Canadian film actresses
Canadian television actresses
Canadian voice actresses
Living people
People from Hamilton, Bermuda
University of Toronto alumni
Bermudian emigrants to Canada